Composer is an application-level dependency manager for the PHP programming language that provides a standard format for managing dependencies of PHP software and required libraries. It was developed by Nils Adermann and Jordi Boggiano, who continue to manage the project. They began development in April 2011 and first released it on March 1, 2012. Composer is strongly inspired by Node.js's "npm" and Ruby's "bundler". The project's dependency solving algorithm started out as a PHP-based port of openSUSE's libzypp satsolver.

Composer runs from the command line and installs dependencies (e.g. libraries) for an application. It also allows users to install PHP applications that are available on "Packagist" which is its main repository containing available packages. It also provides autoload capabilities for libraries that specify autoload information to ease usage of third-party code.

Syntax

Commands 
Composer offers several parameters including :
 require: add the library in parameter to the file composer.json, and install it.
 install: install all libraries from composer.json. It's the command to use to download all PHP repository dependencies.
 update: update all libraries from composer.json, according to the allowed versions mentioned into it.
 remove: uninstall a library and remove it from composer.json.

Libraries definition 
Example of composer.json generated by the following command:
 composer require monolog/monolog

{
    "require": {
        "monolog/monolog": "1.2.*"
    }
}

Versions 
The different authorized versions of the libraries are defined by:

Supported frameworks 

 Symfony version 2 and later
 Laravel version 4 and later
 CodeIgniter version 3.0 and later
 CakePHP version 3.0 and later
 FuelPHP version 2.0 and later
 Drupal version 8 and later
 TYPO3 version 6.2 and later
 SilverStripe version 3.0 later
 Magento version 2.0 later
 Yii version 1.1 and later
 Laminas
 Silex (web framework)
 Lumen (web framework)
Adianti Framework  version 1 and later

See also 
PEAR

References

External links 

 

 
 Composer on GitHub
 Composer documentation
 Composer Tutorial
 Packagist - the main Composer repository
 

Free package management systems
Free software programmed in PHP
PHP software